The Kreuzberg Pride, usually known as Transgenialer CSD, was a parade and festival held in June each year in Kreuzberg, Berlin, to celebrate the lesbian, gay, bisexual, and transgender (LGBT) people and their allies. From 1998 to 2013, the event had been held each year.  In the same month both Berlin Pride and Gay Night at the Zoo is held. More gay festivals in Berlin are the fetish festivals Folsom Europe and Easter in Berlin.

See also 
 LGBT rights in Germany

External links 
 Transgenialer CSD

Annual events in Berlin
Autonomism
Culture in Berlin
LGBT events in Berlin
Parades in Berlin
Pride parades in Germany
Summer events in Germany
Tourist attractions in Berlin